Danger Zone is the fifth studio album by American rock vocalist Sammy Hagar, released on June 21, 1980 by Capitol Records. This is his last studio album during his tenure with Capitol Records. The album includes appearances by then Journey singer Steve Perry and guitarist Neal Schon. The album peaked at number 85 on the Billboard 200 album charts on July 12, 1980.

Song information
 "Love Or Money" was a favorite of John Kalodner, which helped serve as a catalyst in getting Hagar signed to the then new Geffen Records.
 The track "In The Night (Entering The Danger Zone)" was inspired by the film Lucifer Rising.
 "Heartbeat" is the second track on which Hagar shares a writing credit with his then-wife, Betsy. The first was "Wounded In Love" on the Street Machine album.
"Run For Your Life" is a cover of a song from the band Runner's first (and only) album, Runner. This version has the former Journey singer Steve Perry on back-up vocals. It was (co-)produced by Boston's Tom Scholz, who had originally been signed to produce the entire album but was ordered by his own record label to pull out.

Reception

In their retrospective review, Allmusic declared the album a solid effort, pointing out "20th Century Man" and "Run for Your Life" as highlights, but nonetheless determined the album to be "not up to the standard of Sammy Hagar's best material".

Track listing
All songs written by Sammy Hagar except where noted.

 "Love or Money" – 3:00
 "20th Century Man" (Sammy Hagar, Gary Pihl) – 3:13
 "Miles from Boredom" – 3:41
 "Mommy Says, Daddy Says" – 2:33
 "In the Night (Entering the Danger Zone)" – 5:09
 "The Iceman" – 4:09
 "Bad Reputation" – 3:29
 "Heartbeat" (Betsy Hagar, Sammy Hagar) – 3:53
 "Run for Your Life" (Steve Gould, John Pidgeon) – 4:22
 "Danger Zone" – 0:40

Personnel
Band
 Sammy Hagar – vocals, guitar
 Bill Church – bass guitar
 Gary Pihl – guitar, keyboards
 Chuck Ruff – drums
 Geoff Workman – keyboards

Guest musicians
 Steve Perry – background vocals on "Love or Money", "The Iceman", "Heartbeat" and "Run for Your Life"
 Neal Schon – guitar solos on "Love or Money"

Production
 Dave Frazer – engineer assistant
 Tom Scholz – inspiration, pre-production arrangements and drum recordings
 Geoff Workman – engineer

Singles
 "Heartbeat" b/w "Miles from Boredom" – US (Capitol 4893)
 "Heartbeat" (stereo) b/w "Heartbeat" (mono) – US (Capitol P-4893)
 "Heartbeat" b/w "Love or Money" – UK (Capitol RED1)
 "Heartbeat" b/w "Love or Money" – Holland (Capitol 1A 006-86200)
 "Run for Your Life" b/w "Love or Money" – Germany (Capitol 006-86 215)

Releases
 Capitol (US)  – ST-12069
 BGO (1995 UK reissue)  – BGOCD281
 Capitol (Japan)  – TOCP-7516

References

External links
Sammy Hagar – Danger Zone at Discogs
Official lyrics at Redrocker.com

Sammy Hagar albums
1980 albums
Capitol Records albums
Albums recorded at Wally Heider Studios